Robert fitz Richard (died c. 1197), also known as Roberto di Riccardi and Robert the Hospitaller, was a 12th–century Grand Prior of the Knights Hospitaller in England. He was the son of Richard fitz Eustace and Albreda de Lacy.

Life
Robert was a son of Richard fitz Eustace, Baron of Halton and Constable of Chester and Albreda de Lacy. He was the Grand Prior of the Knights Hospitaller in England in 1197.

Citations

References
Burke, John. A Genealogical and Heraldic History of the Commoners of Great Britain and Ireland Enjoying Territorial Possessions Or High Official Rank, But Uninvested with Heritable Honours, Volume 1. Henry Colburn, 1834.
Fincham, H. W. and Edwards, William Rea. The Order of the Hospital of St. John of Jerusalem, and its Grand priory of England. London W.H. & L. Collingridge, 1916.
Whitworth, Porter. A history of the Knights of Malta or The Order of the Hospital of St. John of Jerusalem. London Longman, Brown, Green, Longmans, & Roberts, 1858.

1190s deaths
12th-century English people
Priors of Saint John of Jerusalem in England